Salem Heights is an unincorporated community and census-designated place (CDP) in Columbiana County, Ohio, United States. It was first listed as a CDP prior to the 2020 census, in which its population was 336. Salem Heights sits on the  Blackburn Hill, separated from the city of Salem by the valley of the Middle Fork of the Little Beaver Creek. It is part of the Salem micropolitan area.

Geography
The CDP is in northern Columbiana County, on the western edge of Perry Township, which primarily contains the city of Salem. Salem Heights is bordered to the west by Goshen Township in Mahoning County and by Butler Township in Columbiana County. To the east it is bordered by Ohio State Route 45, a western bypass of Salem. U.S. Route 62 runs through the center of Salem Heights on West State Street, then turns north to join the Route 45 bypass. Ohio State Route 14 (Benton Road) passes through the northern part of Salem Heights, leading southeast into Salem and northwest  to Ravenna. US-62 leads northeast  to Youngstown and west  to Alliance. State Route 45 leads southeast  to Lisbon.

References 

Census-designated places in Columbiana County, Ohio
Census-designated places in Ohio